"Stay with Me" is a song by Scottish DJ and record producer Calvin Harris and American singer-songwriters Justin Timberlake, Halsey, and Pharrell Williams. Produced by the former and written by the artists alongside James Fauntleroy, it was released on 15 July 2022 through Columbia Records as the third single from Harris' sixth studio album, Funk Wav Bounces Vol. 2.

Background
On 6 July 2022, Harris announced the collaboration, song title, and release date, with a picture of the four artists at the shoot of the accompanying music video. Before the release of "Stay with Me", Williams had collaborated with both Harris and Timberlake on separate occasions. In collaboration with Harris, Williams was featured alongside American singer Katy Perry and American rapper Big Sean on the 2017 single "Feels" and, in the same year, on "Heatstroke" with American rapper Young Thug and American singer Ariana Grande. Williams and Timberlake worked together on the 2014 joint track "Brand New".

Composition and lyrics
"Stay with Me" is a funk-inspired pop and disco song. It lets a psychedelic "crispy guitar and a thick-ever present bass" take the center stage for the production. Williams uses a high pitch in the pre-chorus: "The energy is flowing, it keeps us glowing / So we don't need no lights, why is it on? / I'm talking to you, girl, it's a new world". On the chorus, Halsey sings over funk-led production: "I've been waiting for you all year / Come play, make a mess right here / Do whatever, I like it weird / Okay, let 'em disappear / Say whatever you want to hear/ Just stay". She duets with Timberlake on the post-chorus: "All night / Come on and stay with me / Let's stay tight / Come on, let's stay, baby".

Music video
The official music video for "Stay with Me", directed by Emil Nava, premiered on Harris' YouTube channel alongside the song's release on 15 July 2022. The video sees Harris, Timberlake, Halsey, and Williams sporting bright colors as they perform the song, with Timberlake imitating a guitar in the air with his hands and dancing on a moving walkway. The music video also adds an extended outro - this extended outro is titled "Stay With Me (Part 2)" and follows "Stay With Me" on Funk Wav Bounces Vol. 2.

Credits and personnel

 Calvin Harris – production, songwriting, recording, vocal production
 Justin Timberlake – vocals, songwriting, vocal production
 Halsey – vocals, songwriting
 Pharrell Williams – vocals, songwriting, vocal production
 James Fauntleroy – songwriting
 Everton Nelson – violin
 Emil Chakalov – violin
 Hayley Pomfrett – violin
 Lucy Wilkins – violin
 Marianne Haynes – violin
 Charis Jenson – violin
 Tom Pigott-Smith – violin
 Patrick Kiernan – violin
 Ian Humphries – violin
 Perry Montague-Mason – violin
 Richard George – violin
 Warren Zielinski – violin
 Charlie Brown – violin
 John Mills – violin
 Bruce White – viola
 Andy Parker – viola
 Adrian Smith – viola
 Reiad Chibah – viola
 Sara Hajir – cello
 Nick Cooper – cello
 Ian Burdge – cello
 Chris Worsey – cello
 Manny Marroquin – mixing
 Dave Kutch – mastering
 Brandon Buttner – recording, miscellaneous production
 Damien Lewis – recording
 Chris Godbey – recording
 Mike Larson – recording
 Stephen Fitzmaurice – recording
 Anthony Vilchis – engineering assistance
 Trey Station – engineering assistance
 Zach Pereyra – engineering assistance
 Mark Goodchild – miscellaneous production
 Emma Marks – miscellaneous production
 Adele Phillips – miscellaneous production

Charts

Weekly charts

Year-end charts

Certifications

References

2022 singles
2022 songs
Calvin Harris songs
Columbia Records singles
Halsey (singer) songs
Justin Timberlake songs
Pharrell Williams songs
Songs written by Calvin Harris
Songs written by Halsey (singer)
Songs written by James Fauntleroy
Songs written by Justin Timberlake
Songs written by Pharrell Williams